Diegis was a Dacian chief, general and brother of Decebalus. He served as his representative at the peace negotiations held with Domitian in 89AD. After the peace negotiation, Domitian placed a diadem upon Diegis' head, symbolically saying that he held the power to bestow kingship to the Dacians. According to Gábor Vékony, Decebalus never held the royal title.

References

Dacians
Thracian people
Year of birth unknown
Year of death unknown